Jock's Copse is a   Local Nature Reserve on the northern outskirts of Bracknell in Berkshire. It is owned and managed by Bracknell Forest Borough Council.

Along with Temple Copse and Tinkers Copse it forms part of what is known locally as The Three Copses. It is  ancient coppiced woodland, mainly oak and hazel.

History

The site was named after an itinerant Scotsman who lived in the wood in the 1800s. An old air strip prior to 1930s ran between Jock’s and Tinker's Copse.

In 2002 the site was declared as a local nature reserve by Bracknell Forest Borough Council.

Fauna

The site has the following fauna:

Mammals

European badger
Roe deer
Wood mouse
Eastern gray squirrel

Amphibians and Reptiles

Grass snake

Birds

Great spotted woodpecker
Lesser spotted woodpecker
European green woodpecker
Jay
Eurasian bullfinch
European robin
Eurasian blue tit

Invertebrates

Small tortoiseshell

Flora

The site has the following flora:

Trees

Sorbus torminalis
Quercus robur
Corylus avellana
Carpinus betulus

Plants

Primula vulgaris
Lychnis flos-cuculi
Hyacinthoides non-scripta

References

Local Nature Reserves in Berkshire